Muhamad Sandy Firmansyah (born on 7 July 1983) is an Indonesian former footballer who last played as a goalkeeper for RANS Cilegon.

Honours

Club
Sriwijaya
 East Kalimantan Governor Cup: 2018

Arema
 Indonesia President's Cup: 2019

References

External links
 Sandy Firmansyah at Liga Indonesia
 Sandy Firmansyah at Soccerway

1983 births
Association football goalkeepers
Living people
Indonesian Muslims
Indonesian footballers
People from Malang
Sportspeople from East Java
Indonesian Premier Division players
Liga 1 (Indonesia) players
Liga 2 (Indonesia) players
Bontang F.C. players
Persitara Jakarta Utara players
PS Barito Putera players
Gresik United players
Persik Kediri players
Persepam Madura Utama players
Dewa United F.C. players
Sriwijaya F.C. players
Arema F.C. players
PSIM Yogyakarta players
RANS Nusantara F.C. players
Sportspeople from Malang